First Americans in the Arts (FAITA) is a non-profit organization based in Beverly Hills, California.  According to its website, the organization was created "to recognize, honor and promote" Native Americans in the United States and specifically their "participation in the powerful arena of the entertainment industry, incorporating the areas of film, television, music and theater."

In 2022, the organization's website is no longer in a responsive aspect and the status of the organization is unclear.

References

External links
First Americans in the Arts official site
IMDB Event

Non-profit organizations based in California
Beverly Hills, California
Native American arts organizations